John D. "Duke" Wells (February 5, 1914 – November 28, 1989) was an American football, basketball, and baseball player and coach. He served as the head football coach at Henderson State Teachers College—now known as Henderson State University—in Arkadelphia, Arkansas in 1941 and from 1945 to 1961, compiling a record of 73–78–11. He was also Henderson State's head basketball coach from 1941 to 1949, tallying a mark of 63–62. The school's basketball arena is named after him.

Head coaching record

Football

References

External links
 
 

1914 births
1989 deaths
Baseball second basemen
Baseball third basemen
Fulton Tigers players
Henderson State Reddies athletic directors
Henderson State Reddies baseball coaches
Henderson State Reddies baseball players
Henderson State Reddies football coaches
Henderson State Reddies football players
Henderson State Reddies men's basketball coaches
Henderson State Reddies men's basketball players
Hot Springs Bathers players
Jackson Generals (KITTY League) players
American men's basketball players